Walker's Cay is the northernmost island in the Bahamas, part of the North Abaco district. Once a popular sport fishing location, the island has been deserted since 2004, following severe hurricane damage. The island is currently undergoing renovation under new ownership.

Geography 
However, on the north side of Walker's Cay, the water drops off sharply into deep blue ocean depths. The closest island is Grand Cay.

History

Early history and development as sport fishing location
Walker's Cay was named after Thomas Walker, a British judge sent to the island to deal with piracy in the early 1700s. After his death in 1721, the island remained uninhabited for over two hundred years until Buzz Shonnard, a businessman from Palm Beach, Florida, leased the land from the Bahamian government in 1935 and built a small hotel, attracting anglers and tourists to the island. A 75-slip marina was built, and an airstrip, Walker's Cay Airport, with a  runway suitable for light aircraft.

Shonnard's 99-year lease began an era in which Walker's Cay was a well-known sport fishing location. One of Walker's Cay's seasonal residents was American businessman Robert Abplanalp, the inventor of the modern-day aerosol valve for spray cans. Abplanalp bought the lease on the island in 1968 and continued to develop it as a sport fishing destination, not neglecting to pay attention to the conservation of marine life; he began encouraging tag-and-release fishing in the early 1970s. Walker's Cay was particularly known as a location for billfishing, with huge Atlantic blue marlin caught in the area; angling for bonefish was also popular there.

During World War II, Walker's Cay was used by the U.S. military as an anti-submarine base.

Various celebrities became regular visitors of Walker's Cay, including U.S. President Richard Nixon, actress Jane Fonda, singer Roger Daltrey and athletes like Davey Johnson and Roger Staubach.

The Walker's Cay marine area was declared a national park, Walker's Cay National Park, in 2002.

Destruction in 2004 hurricanes
Abplanalp died in 2003, and the following year the island's fortunes were dealt a further blow, when two severe hurricanes, Frances and Jeanne, destroyed the hotel and severely damaged the marina.

Redevelopment
In May 2018, Walker's Cay was sold to Texas businessman and philanthropist Carl Allen, who announced redevelopment efforts. By spring 2019, Allen was engaged in talks with Bahamian authorities on permitting plans.

References

External links
 Walker's Cay National Park entry at the World Database on Protected Areas

Abaco Islands
Uninhabited islands of the Bahamas